Four ships of the Royal Navy have borne the name HMS Bloodhound, after the bloodhound, a breed of dog. A fifth was planned but renamed before being launched.

 was a 12-gun gun-brig launched in 1801 and sold in 1816.
 was an iron paddle vessel launched in 1845 and broken up in 1866.
 was an  launched in 1871. She became a tender in 1905, a boom defence vessel in 1917, and was sold in 1921.
 was a motor torpedo boat used for torpedo trials, launched in 1937 and wrecked in 1943.
HMS Bloodhound was to have been a Type 22 frigate. She was renamed  before being launched in 1984.

Royal Navy ship names